Aaron Rapoport (born May 22, 1954) is an American photographer, best known for his photographs of musicians.

Biography

In a career that spans over three decades, Rapoport has photographed in a wide variety of areas including commercial photography.  His photography of album/CD covers is particularly well known. One of his most famous cover photos is for the Supertramp album, Breakfast in America.

Presently, Rapoport continues to be active as a photographer and is based in Los Angeles, California.

Selected credits

Album covers

References

External links
Official site

1954 births
Fashion photographers
American portrait photographers
People from San Mateo County, California
Living people